Aki Seitsonen (born February 5, 1986) is a Finnish former professional ice hockey player. He was selected by the Calgary Flames in the 4th round (108th overall) of the 2004 NHL Entry Draft.

Seitsonen played in the SM-liiga with both HPK and Lukko during the 2009–10.

Career statistics

Regular season and playoffs

International

References

1986 births
Living people
Calgary Flames draft picks
Finnish ice hockey centres
HPK players
Idaho Steelheads (ECHL) players
Las Vegas Wranglers players
Lukko players
Omaha Ak-Sar-Ben Knights players
Quad City Flames players
Prince Albert Raiders players
People from Riihimäki
Sportspeople from Kanta-Häme